Edgar Bronfman may refer to:

Edgar Bronfman Sr. (1929–2013), Canadian businessman and long-time president of the World Jewish Congress
Edgar Bronfman Jr. (born 1955), American businessman and CEO of the Warner Music Group

See also
Bronfman family